Integrin alpha-5 is a protein that in humans is encoded by the ITGA5 gene.

The product of this gene belongs to the integrin alpha chain family. Integrins are heterodimeric integral membrane proteins composed of an alpha chain and a beta chain. This gene encodes the integrin alpha 5 chain. Alpha chain 5 undergoes post-translational cleavage in the extracellular domain to yield disulfide-linked light and heavy chains that join with beta 1 to form a fibronectin receptor. In addition to adhesion, integrins are known to participate in cell-surface mediated signalling.

Interactions
ITGA5 has been shown to interact with GIPC1.

See also
 Cluster of differentiation
 Integrin

References

Further reading

External links
 
ITGA5 Info with links in the Cell Migration Gateway 
 

Clusters of differentiation
Integrins